The 2007 Checker Auto Parts 500 presented by Pennzoil, the next to last race of the 2007 NASCAR Nextel Cup season and the 2007 Chase for the Nextel Cup ran on Sunday, November 11, 2007 at Phoenix International Raceway in the Phoenix suburb of Avondale, Arizona.  This race was the final race of sixteen to feature NASCAR's template known as the Car of Tomorrow, which will be utilized full-time beginning with the 2008 season.

Qualifying
With a lap of 27.114 seconds at a speed of 132.773 mph, Carl Edwards won his first pole of the season and third of his career. Fellow Chase driver Martin Truex Jr. will start alongside him, missing P1 by only .003 sec. Spring race winner Jeff Gordon starts third, hometown hero J. J. Yeley starts fourth, points leader Jimmie Johnson starts sixth, and defending winner Kevin Harvick starts 34th. Out of the open-wheel imports, IndyCar Series champion Sam Hornish Jr. made his first Cup race on speed, starting 26th, Patrick Carpentier, who is taking over for Scott Riggs, qualified 24th, and Jacques Villeneuve made his second Cup race, starting 27th.

Failed to Qualify: Michael Waltrip (#55), A. J. Allmendinger (#84), Ward Burton (#4), John Andretti (#49), Dale Jarrett (#44), David Reutimann (#00)

NOTE: This is the first time in 2007 where all three Michael Waltrip Racing cars have missed a race.

Results

Top Ten Results: (NOTE: Chase drivers are in bold italics.)

Checkers Auto Parts 500
NASCAR races at Phoenix Raceway
Checker Auto Parts 500
Checker Auto Parts 500